The Cleveland Counts were a Minor League Baseball team that played in the Class D Appalachian League from 1911 to 1913. They were located in Cleveland, Tennessee. Team president Walter E. Rodgers surrendered the franchise to the league on June 4, 1912, after which it was transferred to Morristown, Tennessee, as the Morristown Jobbers.

History
The Counts were formed as charter members of the Appalachian League in 1911. They played their first game on May 22, a 6–1 loss to the Johnson City Soldiers, before a home crowd of around 500 people. After six further loses, the Counts recorded their first win on May 30, defeating the Knoxville Appalachians, 2–1. Cleveland ended their inaugural season in fifth place, out of six teams, with a 39–56 (.411) record. On August 21, 1912, James Gudger pitched a 2–0 no-hitter against Johnson City. The 1912 team improved to 51–51 (.500), a fourth place finish.

On June 4, 1913, team and league president Walter E. Rodgers surrendered the Counts to the league fearing the circuit would soon collapse due to the recent withdrawal of the Bristol Boosters. The league operated the team until it was transferred to Morristown, Tennessee, as the Morristown Jobbers on June 7. Cleveland played its final games on May 30 as part of a doubleheader with the Rome Romans, winning the first game, 8–0, and losing the second, 6–0. The four remaining games of the series were rained out. The Counts were in second place at 10–8 as of June 4. Combined, the Cleveland/Morristown team finished third at 55–46 (.545).

The city did not field another professional baseball team until the Cleveland Manufacturers joined the Appalachian League in 1921.

Season-by-season results

Notable players
Seven Counts also played at least one game in Major League Baseball during their careers. These players and their seasons with Cleveland were:

Davey Crockett (1911–1912)
Tiny Graham (1913)
Dan Griner (1912)
Harry Hedgpeth (1911)
Cliff Markle (1913)
Buck Thrasher (1911–1913)
Fritz Von Kolnitz (1913)

References

External links
Statistics from Baseball-Reference
Statistics from Stats Crew

1911 establishments in Tennessee
1913 disestablishments in Tennessee
Baseball teams established in 1911
Baseball teams disestablished in 1913
Cleveland, Tennessee
Defunct Appalachian League teams
Defunct baseball teams in Tennessee
Professional baseball teams in Tennessee